Jean-Pierre Boulard (born 3 December 1942) is a French former cyclist. His sporting career began with Pedale Chalone. He competed in the team time trial at the 1968 Summer Olympics.

References

External links
 

1942 births
Living people
French male cyclists
Olympic cyclists of France
Cyclists at the 1968 Summer Olympics
People from Épernay
Sportspeople from Marne (department)
Cyclists from Grand Est